Agen is an H chondrite meteorite that fell to earth on September 5, 1814, in Aquitaine, France.

Classification
It is an ordinary chondrite that belongs to the petrologic type 5, thus was assigned to the group H5.

References

See also 
 Glossary of meteoritics
 Meteorite falls
 Ordinary chondrite

Meteorites found in France